Emily Hurtz (born 2 January 1990) is an Australian field hockey player.

References

External links
 

1990 births
Living people
Australian female field hockey players
Commonwealth Games medallists in field hockey
Commonwealth Games gold medallists for Australia
Female field hockey forwards
Field hockey players at the 2010 Commonwealth Games
21st-century Australian women
Medallists at the 2010 Commonwealth Games